() is a town in Karviná District in the Moravian-Silesian Region of the Czech Republic. It has about 7,600 inhabitants. It lies in the historical region of Cieszyn Silesia.

History

The village was first mentioned in a Latin document of Diocese of Wrocław called Liber fundationis episcopatus Vratislaviensis from 1305 as Richinwalde. The village could have been founded during the colonization by Benedictine monks from the Orlová monastery, probably at the end of the 13th century.

Politically the village belonged initially to the Duchy of Teschen, formed in 1290 in the process of feudal fragmentation of Poland and was ruled by a local branch of Piast dynasty. In 1327 the duchy became a fee of Kingdom of Bohemia, which after 1526 became part of the Habsburg monarchy.

The village became a seat of a Catholic parish, mentioned in the register of Peter's Pence payment from 1447 among 50 parishes of Teschen deaconry as Reychenwald.

In 1573, a part of the Duchy of Tetschen with Rychvald was sold to the Barský of Bašť family. Bernard Barský of Bašť had built a Renaissance castle here in 1575–1577 and chose Rychvald as his family seat. The family owned Rychvald until 1630, then several aristocratic families passed into his ownership. From the mid-18th century to 1898, it was in possession of the Moennich and the Larisch von Moennich family, who were its most notable owners. During their rule, the castle was gradually modified and reconstructed.

For centuries, Rychvald was an agricultural village. In the 19th century, the region saw a boom in coal mining and the character of the village began to change.

After World War I, Polish–Czechoslovak War and the division of Cieszyn Silesia in 1920, it became a part of Czechoslovakia. Following the Munich Agreement, in October 1938 together with the Zaolzie region it was annexed by Poland, administratively organised in Frysztat County of Silesian Voivodeship. It was then annexed by Nazi Germany at the beginning of World War II. After the war it was restored to Czechoslovakia.

In 1935, Rychvald was promoted to a market town. In 1985 Rychvald became a town.

Demographics
As of census 2021, previously the numerous Polish minority made up only 1.3% of the population.

Sights

The Starý Dvůr Castle is the oldest building in Rychvald, protected as a cultural monument since 1982. Today it is in private ownership and inaccessible.

The second oldest building is the Church of Saint Anne from 1595.

Notable people
Přemysl Kočí (1917–2003), opera singer, actor and stage director

References

External links

 

Cities and towns in the Czech Republic
Populated places in Karviná District
Cieszyn Silesia